Perry L. Dozier (born 1958 or 1959) is a farmer and politician from Washington. Dozier is a Republican member of the Washington State Senate from District 16.

Personal life 
Dozier's wife is Darleen Dozier. They have two children. Dozier and his family live in Walla Walla, Washington.

References

External links 
 Perry Dozier at ballotpedia.org
 Perry Dozier at ourcampaigns.com
 November 3, 2020 General Election Results - Legislative District 16 - State Senator at results.vote.wa.gov

1950s births
Year of birth uncertain
Living people
21st-century American politicians
Politicians from Walla Walla, Washington
Republican Party Washington (state) state senators
People from Walla Walla County, Washington